The National Museum of Yemen in Sana'a, Yemen, was founded in 1971 in Dar al-Shukr (Palace of Gratefulness) which is one of the Yemeni Imam Palaces. It is located near Qubbat al-Mutawakkil Mosque dome in Al-Tahreer Square in the city center.

The Museum recently moved to a nearby building called Dar Al-Sada (Palace of Happiness). The relocation was made to the newly renovated Palace because it offers the necessary space to accommodate the increasing number of artifacts throughout the history of Yemen.

The museum contains the artifact of ancient Yemen collected from different archaeological sites. The National Museum consists of the four-story building and its room has been reserved for the presentation of rare artifacts and monuments. The exhibits include the artifacts of a Yemeni Imam, artifacts from Marib, ancient Kingdoms of Yemen and artificat from the Islamic States era.

Dar al-Shukr was converted into National Heritage Museum in 1991 but has been closed since years ago due to the lack of preparations and overhaul.

The museum housed over 30 thousand antiquity pieces as per 2007.

References

External links
 Yemeni National Museum hosts exhibition featuring century of photos from the Arabian peninsula

Museums established in 1971
Museums in Yemen
Yemen
Buildings and structures in Sanaa